Safety statement is the name given to the document that outlines how a company manages their health and safety in the Republic of Ireland, based upon the Safety, Health and Welfare at Work Act, 2005. The requirement to have a written safety statement is outlined in Section 20 of the above Act, although it was also a requirement in the original (but now revoked) Act of 1989. The document is primarily based on the risk assessment of workplace hazards.

Summary
The safety statement document details how the organisation identifies, assesses and controls risks in the workplace and what arrangements are in place to achieve this. It is a legal requirement for all employers, regardless of the number of employees. The exceptions are if there are three or fewer employed by a company or self-employed person and the sector or work activity carried out is covered under a Code of Practice prepared by the Health and Safety Authority, then that is considered to be sufficient (although in this case, there is still a requirement to carry out risk assessments for the work activity).

Background
It is a legal requirement in nearly all countries for employers to ensure the health and safety of employees and others who may be affected by an organisations work activities (such as members of the public, contractors, site visitors or guests etc.). This requirement is normally explicitly stated in the health and safety legislation that applies to each country. There are usually a number of basic criteria that need to be met by employers in order to achieve this goal (such as adequate training, suitable instruction and supervision, the provision of information, provision of emergency response plans and the assessment of risk amongst others). In addition, there is normally a requirement for an organisation to document in writing how it will ensure that it meets the minimum legal health and safety requirements.

References

External links
 Irish Health and Safety Authority

Occupational safety and health
Statements